Daniel Sampaio Simões (born 11 January 1996), known as Danielzinho or simply Daniel, is a Brazilian footballer who plays as midfielder for Bahia.

Club career

Fluminense
Born in Rio de Janeiro, Daniel joined Fluminense's youth setup in 2003, aged seven. He made his first team debut on 27 January 2016, starting in a 0–1 Primeira Liga loss against Atlético Paranaense.

After being rarely used, Daniel was loaned to Série B side Oeste on 19 July 2016. He returned to Flu for the 2017 season, but was again loaned to Oeste after featuring rarely.

Daniel started the 2018 campaign on loan at Botafogo-SP, and returned to Oeste for the 2018 Série B before being recalled by Fluminense on 2 August 2018. He made his Série A debut late in the month, coming on as a late substitute for Junior Sornoza in a 1–2 away loss against Cruzeiro.

Daniel became a regular starter for Fluminense in the 2019 season, but did not reach an agreement to renew his contract with the club.

Bahia
On 12 December 2019, Daniel signed a two-year contract with fellow top tier side Bahia.

Career statistics

Honours
Bahia
Campeonato Baiano: 2020
Copa do Nordeste: 2021

References

External links

1996 births
Living people
Footballers from Rio de Janeiro (city)
Brazilian footballers
Association football midfielders
Campeonato Brasileiro Série A players
Campeonato Brasileiro Série B players
Fluminense FC players
Oeste Futebol Clube players
Botafogo Futebol Clube (SP) players
Esporte Clube Bahia players